Wepemnofret was a Royal prince of the Fourth Dynasty. 
His father was Khufu, and mother unknown. A stela embedded in the wall of his tomb was found near the Great Pyramid of Giza, in the Giza West Field. The stele was discovered by the Hearst Expedition in 1905, and is considered to be the turning point between two artistic styles: the Archaic Style of the Fertile Period, and the Mature Style of the 4th Dynasty.

References

Princes of the Fourth Dynasty of Egypt